Carefree may refer to:

 Carefree, Arizona, town in the United States
 Carefree, Indiana, community in the United States
 Carefree (chant), a football chant sung by Chelsea FC supporters
 Carefree (feminine hygiene), feminine hygiene product
 Carefree (film), 1938 film with Fred Astaire and Ginger Rogers
 Carefree (Devon Williams album), 2008
 Carefree (Samantha Stollenwerck album), 2009
 "Carefree", a song by The Refreshments
 CareFree, a brand of chewing gum made by The Hershey Company